David Victor Moriaud (born 20 October 1900, date of death unknown) was a Swiss sprinter. He competed in three events at the 1924 Summer Olympics.

References

External links
 

1900 births
Year of death missing
Athletes (track and field) at the 1924 Summer Olympics
Swiss male sprinters
Olympic athletes of Switzerland